Dharamlal Kaushik (born 1 February 1958) is an Indian politician from the Bharatiya Janta Party and the 3rd speaker of Chhattisgarh Legislative Assembly from 2009 to 2014. On 4 January 2019, he was elected as the leader of opposition in Chhattisgarh Legislative Assembly after the BJP lost the legislative assembly election to the INC held in 2018. He also served as the state president of BJP's Chhattisgarh unit from 2014 till March 2019.

Political career 
Kaushik was first elected to Madhya Pradesh Legislative Assembly in 1998 from Bilha (Vidhan Sabha). After creation of Chhattisgarh from Madhya Pradesh state, Kaushik contested 2003 Chhattisgarh Legislative Assembly election but lost to Siyaram Kaushik of Indian National Congress. He was elected to Chhattisgarh Legislative Assembly in 2008 by defeating Indian National Congress candidate Siyaram Kaushik by a margin of 6,070 votes.
Again, he lost 2013 Chhattisgarh Legislative Assembly election to his Congress rival Siyaram Kaushik. On 11 December 2018, he again won the election from same constituency and became Leader of the Opposition of Chhattisgarh Legislative Assembly.

References

Speakers of the Chhattisgarh Legislative Assembly
Leaders of the Opposition in Chhattisgarh
1958 births
Living people
People from Bilaspur district, Chhattisgarh
Chhattisgarh MLAs 2008–2013
Chhattisgarh MLAs 2000–2003
Bharatiya Janata Party politicians from Chhattisgarh
Chhattisgarh MLAs 2018–2023
Madhya Pradesh MLAs 1998–2003